David Fukamachi Regnfors (born 11 April 1984) is a Swedish actor.

Regnfors' father is Japanese and his mother is Swedish. He was born in Sweden, but spent his early years in Japan. When his parents separated, he moved with his mother to Sweden. He attended high school at the Stockholm Theatre Elementary School and graduated from the Theatre Academy in Gothenburg in 2010.

Filmography
Call Girl (2012)
Hotell (2013)
Gentlemen (2014)

References

External links

21st-century Swedish male actors
1984 births
Living people
Swedish male film actors
Swedish people of Japanese descent
Male actors of Japanese descent
Place of birth missing (living people)